Namrud (also Romanized as Namrūd and Nīmrūd) is a village in Shahrabad Rural District, in the Central District of Firuzkuh County, Tehran Province, Iran. At the 2006 census, its population was 28, made up of 10 families.

References 

Populated places in Firuzkuh County